Rajkumar or Raj Kumar may refer to:

Title 
 non-ruling princely title for a son (sometimes more kin) of a Raja or equivalent royal prince in Southern Asia

People 
 Raaj Kumar (1926–1996), Indian actor in Hindi films
 Dr. Rajkumar (1929–2006), Indian actor in Kannada films
 Rajkumar (Tamil actor), Indian actor in Tamil films
 Raj Kumar (athlete) (born 1962), Indian athlete
 Raj Kumar (badminton) (born 1986), Indian badminton player
 Raj Kumar Shukla (1875–?), Indian indigo cultivator
 Rajkumar Hirani (born 1962), Indian producer and director
 Rajkumar Kohli (born 1930), Indian producer and director
 Rajkummar Rao (born 1984) also known as Raj Kumar, Hindi film actor
 Rajkumar Santoshi, Indian producer and director
 Rajkumar Sethupathi (born 1954), Indian film actor in Malayalam and Tamil movies in the 1980s
 Raj Kumar (neurosurgeon) (born 1959), Indian neurosurgeon
 Rajkumar (politician), Indian politician
 Rajkumar Pori, Indian politician from Uttarakhand
 Raj Kumar, founder of development news organization Devex

Films 
 Rajkumar (1964 film), a Bollywood film, starring Shammi Kapoor and Sadhana
 Rajkumar (1996 film), a Bollywood film, starring Anil Kapoor and Madhuri Dixit
 Rajkumar (2008 film), a Bengali film, starring Prosenjit Chatterjee and Anu Chowdhury
 R... Rajkumar, a 2013 Bollywood film starring Shahid Kapoor and Sonakshi Sinha

See also 
 Rajkumari (disambiguation), the female equivalent of Rajkumar
 Maharajkumar, equivalent title for a Maharaja's royal crown prince in India
 Rajesh Kumar (disambiguation)